Joseph Leslie Cundall, also Cundal, was the Attorney General of Jamaica.

He was the son of the English migrant to Jamaica, Frank Cundall.

References 

Attorneys General of Jamaica
Year of birth missing
Year of death missing